The 2016–17 East Tennessee State Buccaneers women's basketball team represented East Tennessee State University (ETSU) during the 2016–17 NCAA Division I women's basketball season. The "Bucs", led by fourth-year head coach Brittney Ezell, played their home games at the Freedom Hall Civic Center as members of the Southern Conference (SoCon). They finished the season 16–14, 8–6 in SoCon play to finish in third place. They lost in the quarterfinals of the SoCon women's tournament to Samford.

During the Elon game on December 17, 2016, junior guard Tianna Tarter became the 23rd ETSU women's basketball player to surpass the 1,000-point mark and only the fifth in program history to reach it in three seasons. On December 20, 2016, senior Shamauria Bridges became ETSU women's basketball's career leader in three-pointers in defeating Coppin State. Bridges ended the game at 242 career threes. Bridges finished the season with 90 made three-pointers, ranking as the most in a single season in school history and fifth most in SoCon history. Tarter ranked as tied in second place for three-pointers in school history.

Previous season
The Bucs ended the 2015–16 season at 16–14, 8–6 in SoCon play to finish in fourth place. They lost in the quarterfinals of the SoCon women's tournament to Furman.

Roster

Schedule

 
|-
!colspan=9 style="background:#041E42; color:#FFC72C;"| Exhibition
|-

|-
!colspan=9 style="background:#041E42; color:#FFC72C;"| Non-conference regular season

|-
!colspan=9 style="background:#041E42; color:#FFC72C;"| SoCon regular season

|-
!colspan=9 style="background:#041E42; color:#FFC72C;"| SoCon Tournament

Source:

References

East Tennessee State Buccaneers women's basketball seasons
East Tennessee
East Tennessee
East Tennessee